Central Square is a large public space in Cardiff, Wales, adjacent to Cardiff Central railway station and included Cardiff Central bus station between 1954 and 2015. It was redeveloped and extended in the late 2010s and early 2020s.

History

Until the 1930s an area of terraced housing, churches and shops, named Temperance Town, occupied the current site of Central Square. As a result, due to its legal history, Central Square is now one of a few areas in Cardiff designated an alcohol control zone, allowing the police  to confiscate alcohol.

Between 1932 and 1934, the Great Western Railway replaced the original 1850s station building (also designed by their architect's department) with a new Art Deco building faced in Portland stone, enclosing a booking hall with noted Art Deco light fittings, all topped by a clock cupola. The Great Western Railway has its full name carved onto the façade (larger than the name of the station). During the new station's planning and construction, the GWR made representations to Cardiff Corporation to improve the immediate area. As a result, from 1930 the Corporation started to plan the removal of the adjacent working-class district, Temperance Town.

The streets of Temperance Town were demolished in 1937, although the intervention of World War II halted redevelopment plans until after the war. A new bus station was opened in 1954, and a new office building, Marland House, was constructed to the east of the bus station.

 
In 1999 a  sculpture, Cader Idris (named after Cadair Idris) was erected in Central Square. However, within six months it was reportedly described as a "dirty disgrace" and (in 2008) it was reportedly attracting undesirables to congregate on it. It was later dismantled and relocated to Cardiff Bay Wetlands Reserve.

Redevelopment
By the early 2010s, Marland House had become a hard-to-let 1950s office block, adjacent to a multi-storey car park; plus a series of street-side shops including a Greggs, Burger King, Cardiff Point, but mostly occupied by charity shops. With the development of St David's/Dewi Sant complete, and the resultant pedestrianisation of St Mary Street, Cardiff Council was now looking further eastwards to redevelop the Square, with the aim of creating a modern transport gateway to Cardiff city centre.

In 2010 hotel developer Urban Solutions promised £300,000 towards improvements towards the long-term regeneration of Central Square. They also agreed to fund twelve cycle stands and the OYBike hire point outside Central Station.

In 2012 another proposal was unveiled by Cardiff Council to sell off the existing bus station land for redevelopment and invest some of the money in Central Square, to be renamed "Capital Square". An  fountain was envisaged by the architects, Stride Treglown, along with a "Welsh Garden" reflecting the landscape of Wales. The bus station would close in September 2012 and a 10-12 storey office headquarters would be built on the site. A new bus station would be constructed to the east, after the demolition of Marland House.

In October 2014 another master plan was announced, including one million square feet (9.3 hectares) of new office space and a 200-bed hotel. The master plan was being overseen by Foster and Partners, led by Cardiff-born partner Gerard Evenden. As well as the original office space and hotel, the new plan also accommodated the relocated headquarters and main news studios of BBC Wales in a new building, New Broadcasting House.

Construction began in Autumn 2015 on buildings located on the old bus station, with Marland House scheduled for demolition from Summer 2016. There was also a proposed £80 million development of Cardiff Central station, with a two floor shopping and retail area located above a new bus station, connected to the railway station through both structures' extensive use of glass.

One Central Square opened in 2016 for tenants including Blake Morgan LLP and Julian Hodge Bank. Two Central Square also opened in 2016 with tenants including Hugh James LLP and the Cardiff School of Journalism. In 2019 BBC Cymru Wales moved into Three Central Square, directly opposite the main terminal building. That same year, Cardiff Council confirmed the Cardiff Transport Interchange will be built by 2023, located adjacent to the BBC as a replacement for the bus station. 6 Central Square, occupied by HM Revenue & Customs and named bilingually Tŷ William Morgan - William Morgan House, was completed in 2020.

References

External links
 
Official website
Panorama of Central Square (Dec 2003), Urban75.org

Redevelopment projects in Cardiff
Squares in Cardiff